Gridinskaya is a rural locality (a village) in Khozminskoye Rural Settlement of Velsky District, Arkhangelsk Oblast, Russia. The population was 13 as of 2014.

Geography 
Gridinskaya is located on the Yelyuga River, 60 km northwest of Velsk (the district's administrative centre) by road. Nikolskaya is the nearest rural locality.

References 

Rural localities in Velsky District